King's University College may refer to:

 King's University College (Edmonton)
 King's University College (University of Western Ontario)
 King's University College, Accra, Ghana; see List of universities in Ghana
 University of King's College, Halifax, Nova Scotia

See also
 King's College (disambiguation)